The 2005 Bucknell Bison football team was an American football team that represented Bucknell University during the 2005 NCAA Division I-AA football season. Bucknell finished last in the Patriot League.

In their third year under head coach Tim Landis, the Bison compiled a 1–10 record. Sean Conover and Stephen Watts were the team captains.

The Bison were outscored 332 to 179. Bucknell's winless (0–6) conference record finished seventh in the Patriot League standings.

Bucknell played its home games at Christy Mathewson–Memorial Stadium on the university campus in Lewisburg, Pennsylvania.

Schedule

References

Bucknell
Bucknell Bison football seasons
Bucknell Bison football